Nayan Pal Rawat is an Indian politician. He was elected to the Haryana Legislative Assembly from Prithla in the 2019 Haryana Legislative Assembly election as a member and Independent candidate. Previously, he was associated with Bharatiya Janata Party. He is from village Asaoti (Palwal).

References 

1971 births
Living people
Bharatiya Janata Party politicians from Haryana
People from Faridabad district
Haryana MLAs 2019–2024